Government Post Graduate College, Abbottabad , also known as GPGC No.1 Abbottabad, is a government tertiary college located in Abbottabad. GPGC No.1 is affiliated with Abbottabad University (AUST) and BISE Abbottabad for Bachelor and intermediate programs respectively.

History 
GPGC college was established in 1944 in a rented building on the Mansehra Road, Abbottabad. After independence, it was shifted to the center of the city in the Araya School. In 1954 the Chief Minister of the N-W.F.P (now Khyber Pakhtunkhwa) Abdul Qayyum Khan inaugurated the present building at the link road Abbottabad.

In 1966, GPGC Mandian started M.Sc Physics and MA Economics programs. In 1973, MA programs of English, Urdu and M.Sc programs in Chemistry and Mathematics were started. M.Sc Botany and MA Political Science programs begun in the campus in 1986. In 1999 M.Sc Computer Science was started. In 2010 MA History was further added at postgraduate level. Now it is called a mini university. The college has almost five thousand students from 11th grade to 16th grade in 27 common subjects of science and arts. GPGC Abbottabad offers 4-year bachelor program in English, Mathematics, Chemistry, Computer Science. Physics, Economics, Botany, Political Science, GIS and H.P.E.
In 2019, GPGC No. 1 hosted the weightlifting event of the 33rd National Games of Pakistan. As of 2022, regional directorate of Higher Education for Hazara division is planned to be established in the old staff hostel of the Government Postgraduate College No 1, Abbottabad, for the management of administrative and financial affairs of 40 colleges.

Faculties and departments 
At present, GPGC Abbottabad offers Intermediate, Bachelors, Masters and BS level programs.

Masters degree awarding departments 
There are 11 Masters degree departments in GPGC Abbottabad.
 Botany
 Chemistry
 Economics
 Mathematics
 Physics
 Statistics
 English
 Political Science
 Islamiyat
 History
 Urdu

BS degree awarding departments 
The BS degree awarding departments of GPGC are: 
 Botany
 Computer Science
 Chemistry
 Economics
 English
 G.I.S
 H.P.E
 Mathematics
 Physics
 Political Science
 Urdu
 History
 Pakistan Studies.

See also 
 Government Post Graduate College Mandian, Abbottabad
 Government Post Graduate College, Mansehra

References

External links 
 GPGC No.1 Abbottabad Admissions website

20th-century establishments in Pakistan
Universities and colleges in Abbottabad
Educational institutions established in 1944
Abbottabad District